Testis expressed 11 is a protein that in humans is encoded by the TEX11 gene.

Function

This gene is X-linked and is expressed in only male germ cells. Two alternatively spliced transcript variants encoding distinct isoforms have been found for this gene. [provided by RefSeq, Jul 2008].

References

Further reading